The W. C. Record House, also known as Roberts House, located at 146 W. 2nd St. in Winnemucca, Nevada, United States, was built in 1874 in a vernacular Gothic Revival style.  It has a gingerbread vergeboard.  It was expanded in 1879 and additionally modified during 1886–1899.  It is named for its first owner, W.C. Record, who was a businessman in lumber and building.
 
The house was listed on the National Register of Historic Places in 1980.

References

External links

Houses in Humboldt County, Nevada
Winnemucca, Nevada
Houses completed in 1874
Houses on the National Register of Historic Places in Nevada
National Register of Historic Places in Humboldt County, Nevada
Gothic Revival architecture in Nevada
1874 establishments in Nevada